The 1991 season was the last season in the top Soviet football league for Shakhtar Donetsk.

Players

Main squad

Reserve squad

Transfers

In

Out

Competitions

Overall

Top League

References

External links
 Состав команды «Шахтёр» Донецк в сезоне 1991. footballfacts.ru

FC Shakhtar Donetsk seasons